
This is a list of the National Register of Historic Places listings in Northeast Denver, Colorado.

This is intended to be a complete list of the properties and districts on the National Register of Historic Places in northeastern Denver, Colorado, United States. Northeast Denver is defined as being all of the city east of the Platte River north of Sixth Avenue, excluding the downtown neighborhoods of Capitol Hill, Central Business District, Civic Center, Five Points, North Capitol Hill, and Union Station. The locations of National Register properties and districts may be seen in an online map.

There are 300 properties and districts listed on the National Register in Denver. Northeast Denver includes 72 of these properties and districts, including 4 that extend into other regions; the city's remaining properties and districts are listed elsewhere. Another property in Northeast Denver was listed but has been removed.

Current listings

|}

Former listing

|}

See also
List of National Historic Landmarks in Colorado
National Register of Historic Places listings in Denver, Colorado

References

Northeast